The Cedar to Green River Trail, also known as the Lake Wilderness Trail is a  soft surface rail trail in Washington. This trail is designated for non-motorized use and connects Maple Valley to Lake Wilderness. In Maple Valley it connects to the Cedar River Trail.

Rail trails in Washington (state)
Transportation in King County, Washington